The VTB United League 2010–11 was the second complete season of the VTB United League, which is Eastern Europe's top-tier level men's professional club basketball competition. The tournament featured 12 teams, from 8 countries.

Teams

Group stage

Group A

Group B

Final four

Semifinals

Third place game

Final

Awards

All-Tournament Team
Ramel Curry (Azovmash Mariupol)
Maciej Lampe (UNICS Kazan)
Keith Langford (Khimki Moscow Region) 
Marko Popović (UNICS Kazan)
Martynas Gecevičius (Lietuvos Rytas)

All-Final Four Team
Vitaly Fridzon (Khimki Moscow Region)
Alexey Shved (CSKA Moscow)
Kelly McCarty (UNICS Kazan)
Victor Khryapa (CSKA Moscow)
Krešimir Lončar (Khimki Moscow Region)

MVPs

External links 
Official Website 
Official Website 

2010-11
2010–11 in European basketball leagues
2010–11 in Russian basketball
2010–11 in Lithuanian basketball
2010–11 in Ukrainian basketball
2010–11 in Latvian basketball
2010–11 in Estonian basketball
2010–11 in Polish basketball
2010–11 in Belarusian basketball
2010–11 in Finnish basketball